Alfred Beit School is a primary school in the suburb of Mabelreign in Harare Zimbabwe. The school was named after Alfred Beit. The school offers education from the ECD grade all the way up to grade 7. Alfred Beit has a house system which is mainly used for sports. There are four houses, which are sable, eland, roan and kudu.

Notable alumni 
Petina Gappah - writer
Albert Alan Owen - composer 
Grant Symmonds - Currie Cup cricketer

Day schools in Zimbabwe
Schools in Harare